Chhau may refer to:

 Chhau dance in India
 Chhau Mask of Purulia district
 Chhau, Jhunjhunu, an Indian village
 Chhaupadi, a menstrual taboo in western hills of Nepal.
 Chháu, a Minnan-dialect romanization of the Chinese surname Cao
 chháu-á-ké, the Minnan language name for caozai guo